The 2002–03 Illinois State Redbirds men's basketball team represented Illinois State University during the 2002–03 NCAA Division I men's basketball season. The Redbirds, led by fourth year head coach Tom Richardson, played their home games at Redbird Arena and competed as a member of the Missouri Valley Conference.

They finished the season 8–21, 5–13 in conference play to finish in a tie for eighth place. They were the number nine seed for the Missouri Valley Conference tournament. They were victorious over Drake University in their opening round game but were defeated by Southern Illinois University in their quarterfinal game.

Roster

Schedule

|-
!colspan=9 style=|Exhibition Season

|-
!colspan=9 style=|Regular Season

|-
!colspan=9 style=|State FarmMissouri Valley Conference {MVC} tournament

References

Illinois State Redbirds men's basketball seasons
Illinois State
Illinois State Redbirds Men's
Illinois State Redbirds Men's